Robert Duncan Wilmot,  (16 October 1809 – 13 February 1891) was a Canadian politician and a Father of Confederation.

Early life and family 
Wilmot was born in Fredericton, New Brunswick on 16 October 1809. He was the son of John McNeil and Susanna (Susan) Harriet (born Wiggins) Wilmot. He moved to Saint John with his family at around the age of five, and there he was educated. In 1833 he married Susannah (Susan) Elizabeth Mowat of St Andrews. His father, John McNeil Wilmot, was a big tank and ship owner. Wilmot worked for his father's business and represented the company in Liverpool, England from 1835 to 1840. It is there that his son, Robert Duncan Wilmot, Jr., a future Member of Parliament, was born.

Political career

New Brunswick
Wilmot served as mayor of Saint John from 1849 to 1850. He represented Saint John County in the Legislative Assembly of New Brunswick from 1847 to 1861, and from 1865 to 1867, and was  member of the Executive Council of New Brunswick, serving as the Surveyor-General from 1851 to 1854, and provincial secretary from 1856 to 1857.

He was a New Brunswick delegate to the London Conference of 1866, which settled the final terms for Canadian Confederation.

Federal politics
Following Confederation, he was appointed to the Senate of Canada on 23 October 1867 by royal proclamation, and represented the Senate division of New Brunswick. In 1878, he became Speaker of the Senate, and was also a member of the ministry of John A. Macdonald.

Lieutenant Governor of New Brunswick
Wilmot resigned from the Senate on 10 February 1880 and was appointed the sixth Lieutenant Governor of New Brunswick.  He served in that position until 1885.

Death
Wilmot died at his estate in Sunbury County at the age of 81. His home was designated a National Historic Site of Canada in 1975.
He is buried in Sunbury County Oromocto Anglican Church cemetery on Broad Road.

References

External links 

 
 
 

1809 births
1891 deaths
Members of the Executive Council of New Brunswick
Members of the Legislative Assembly of New Brunswick
Lieutenant Governors of New Brunswick
Speakers of the Senate of Canada
Canadian senators from New Brunswick
Fathers of Confederation
Members of the King's Privy Council for Canada
Conservative Party of Canada (1867–1942) senators
Mayors of Saint John, New Brunswick
Politicians from Fredericton
Persons of National Historic Significance (Canada)
Provincial Secretaries of New Brunswick